Dionicio Cerón Pizarro (born October 9, 1965 in Toluca) is a former marathon runner from Mexico, whose personal best in the classic distance was 2:08:30. He represented his native country two times at the Summer Olympics: in 1992 and 1996. He also won the London Marathon three consecutive times between 1994 and 1996, the only man to have ever achieved this feat. Eluid Kipchoge, António Pinto and Martin Lel are the only other men to have won it three times or more, however not in consecutive years.

Achievements

References

External links

1965 births
Living people
People from Toluca
Sportspeople from the State of Mexico
Mexican male long-distance runners
Mexican male marathon runners
Olympic male marathon runners
Olympic athletes of Mexico
Athletes (track and field) at the 1992 Summer Olympics
Athletes (track and field) at the 1996 Summer Olympics
Central American and Caribbean Games gold medalists for Mexico
Competitors at the 1990 Central American and Caribbean Games
Competitors at the 1993 Central American and Caribbean Games
Central American and Caribbean Games medalists in athletics
World Athletics Championships medalists
World Athletics Championships athletes for Mexico
Japan Championships in Athletics winners
London Marathon male winners
Recipients of the Association of International Marathons and Distance Races Best Marathon Runner Award
20th-century Mexican people